Germein is a pop band based in Adelaide, South Australia. Previously known as the Germein Sisters, its members are three siblings, Georgia Germein, Ella Germein, and Clara Germein.

They have toured Europe, China, New Zealand and Australia. Their 2013 debut album, Because You Breathe, was recorded in Ireland.

In 2018, the band played a 15-date stadium tour in the UK, supporting British group Little Mix on their Summer Hits Tour, performing to audiences of up to 35,000 people. That same year, they recorded the single "Knocking At My Door", as a follow-up to their previous track "Talking", which had received national airplay in Australia.

Members

Georgia Germein 

Georgia Germein is an acoustic pop singer-songwriter. She performs solo (vocals, guitar/piano) as well as with her two sisters as the band Germein. Prior to the formation of the band, Georgia released a solo album, Take My Hand, in 2010.

Georgia grew up in the bush in the Adelaide Hills. She has undertaken various charitable activities including working in the Kalahari, South Africa, and Nepal, acting as a youth ambassador for World Vision in 2010. Georgia has been the recipient of awards including seven ASME Young Composers Awards. In 2007, she received the South Australian Premiers Award and achieved a semi-finalist status in the International Songwriting Competition. In 2009, she was announced as the National winner of the Young Bloods Radio Competition for Nova.

Ella Germein 

Ella Germain plays bass, electric cello, and sings backing vocals with the band. She studied and works in the media arts and communications field, including television presentation.

Clara Germein 

Clara Germein plays drums with the band.

Discography

Studio albums

Awards

South Australian Music Awards
The South Australian Music Awards (previously known as the Fowler's Live Music Awards) are annual awards that exist to recognise, promote and celebrate excellence in the South Australian contemporary music industry. They commenced in 2012.
 
|-
| 2019
| Germein
| People's Choice Pop Award  
| 
|- 
| 2020
| Germein
| People's Choice Pop Award  
|

References

External links

 Official website

Australian musical groups